Patrick Salomon (born 10 June 1988) is a former Austrian professional footballer who played as a midfielder, lastly for the Croatian HNL club Šibenik.

Career
In early December 2022, HNK Šibenik announced that Salomon has ended his professional career.

References

1988 births
Living people
Austrian footballers
SC Austria Lustenau players
FK Austria Wien players
SC Rheindorf Altach players
SV Mattersburg players
Atromitos F.C. players
HNK Šibenik players
2. Liga (Austria) players
Croatian Football League players
Austrian Football Bundesliga players
Super League Greece players
Austrian expatriate footballers
Expatriate footballers in Greece
Association football midfielders
Austrian expatriate sportspeople in Greece
Expatriate footballers in Croatia
Austrian expatriate sportspeople in Croatia